Mayura may refer to:
 Mayura (film), a 1975 Indian Kannada language film
 Mayura (magazine), a Kannada monthly literary magazine
 Mayura (mythology), one of the sacred and highly sanctified birds of Hindu mythology
 Mayurasharma (345–365), founder of the Kadamba kingdom of Banavasi
 Mahamayuri, a Wisdom King in the Buddhist Pantheon

Characters 
 Mayura Daidouji, a main character in the manga The Mythical Detective Loki Ragnarok
 Mayura Ichikawa, a character in the anime Best Student Council
 Mayura Seno, a character in the manga Alice 19th
 Mayura, an antagonist in the French T.V show Miraculous: Tales of Ladybug and Cat Noir